The Society of the Exterminating Angel was a possibly apocryphal Catholic group in Spain that was created to kill Spanish liberals, founded in 1821. It was revived in 1834 under the presidency of the Bishop of Osma. 

The film The Exterminating Angel, by Luis Buñuel, was named after this society.

References

Organizations established in 1821
Organizations established in 1834
Secret societies in Spain
1821 establishments in Spain
1834 establishments in Spain